Débora Anahi Dionicius (born 19 March 1988) is an Argentine professional boxer. She has held the WBO interim female featherweight title since November 2021 and previously the IBF female super flyweight title from 2012 to 2018.

Professional boxing record

References

Living people
1988 births
Argentine women boxers
Sportspeople from Entre Ríos Province
Bantamweight boxers
Featherweight boxers
World super-flyweight boxing champions
International Boxing Federation champions